The 2010–11 season was the 131st season of competitive football by Rangers.

Overview
Rangers played a total of 55 competitive matches during the 2010–11 season. With financial problems at the club ongoing, the summer began for Rangers with several players leaving the club. With a limited transfer budget and a small squad. Walter Smith had to decide whether to increase the number of playing staff or improve the starting eleven, he opted for quality.

Both sides of the Old Firm began the season with eight league wins in a row, however, with the sides meeting on matchday nine something had to give. Rangers claimed a 3–1 victory over Celtic and took early control of the league. A 1–1 draw at home to Inverness CT the following weekend ended Rangers 100% start to the season and a home defeat to Hibernian inflicted the team's first league defeat of the season, the first of five. The cold spell in the winter of 2010–11 saw many postponements and for long spells Rangers were behind Celtic but with games in hand. In the third league meeting between the Old Firm, Celtic came out on top and mathematical lead the table, for the first time that season. However Celtic's advantage was short lived after a loss to Motherwell the following week. This allowed Rangers to regain top spot, but 3–2 loss to Dundee United at Ibrox followed by a 0–0 draw in the final Old Firm fixture left the title in Celtic's hands, with just four matches remaining. There was to be a final twist in the league season, on 3 May Celtic lost a rearranged match away to Inverness and so with three matches remaining Rangers had a one-point lead. Smith's side went on to win all three fixtures, scoring 11 goals, and claimed the club's 54th league championship.

In the domestic cup competitions Rangers won the League Cup after beating Celtic 2-1 AET. However, Rangers lost 1–0 to Celtic in the fifth round replay in Scottish Cup. The match was marked by several incidents, three Rangers players were sent-off and Celtic manager Neil Lennon and McCoist were involved in a pitch side bust up.

In Europe, Rangers automatically qualified for the UEFA Champions League group stages for the second season in a row. They drew Manchester United, Valencia and Bursaspor. Rangers were unbeaten in their first three group stage games, with a 0–0 draw at Old Trafford, a 1–0 victory over Bursaspor at Ibrox and a 1–1 draw at home to Valencia. A 3–0 defeat in Spain to Valencia followed by a 1–0 loss at home to Manchester United ended Rangers chances of qualifying for the last 16, but third place and a spot in the UEFA Europa League was already secured with Bursaspor having failed to pick up a point in five games. In the last group match Rangers drew 1–1 in Turkey, giving Bursaspor their first Champions League point. However, Rangers did make it to the last 16 of the Europa League, beating Sporting Lisbon on away goals in the last 32 but lost to PSV Eindhoven on aggregate.

On 6 May 2011, it was confirmed that David Murray had sold his controlling interest in the club (85.3%) to Wavetower limited for £1, a company owned by businessman Craig Whyte.

Players

Squad information

Transfers

In

Total spending: £5.95m

Out

Total income: £4.4m

New contracts

Squad statistics

Top scorers

Last updated: 15 May 2011
Source: Match reports
Only competitive matches

Disciplinary record

Last updated: 15 May 2011
Source: Match reports
Only competitive matches

Club

Board of directors

Coaching staff

Other staff

Matches

Scottish Premier League

UEFA Champions League

UEFA Europa League

Scottish Cup

League Cup

Friendlies

Competitions

Overall

Scottish Premier League

Standings

Results summary

Results by round

UEFA Champions League

Group C

References 

Rangers F.C. seasons
Rangers
Scottish football championship-winning seasons
Rangers
Rangers